Gigaquit, officially the Municipality of Gigaquit (Surigaonon: Lungsod nan Gigaquit), is a 4th class municipality in the province of Surigao del Norte, Philippines. According to the 2020 census, it has a population of 21,849 people.

The name is derived from the words gigad (meaning "shore") and gakit (meaning "bamboo raft") and refers to the means of transportation that the early settlers used to travel from the inland to the shore.

History
Gigaquit was established in 1850 by Cero, a native who fortified the place to make it safe from Moro raiders. During this period, the local population was Christianized by priests from religious orders who made Saint Augustine their patron saint.

Bacuag and Claver, which had been part of Gigaquit, became separate municipalities in 1918 and 1955 under Executive Order Nos. 61 and 126 respectively.

Geography

Barangays
Gigaquit is politically subdivided into 13 barangays.
 Alambique (Poblacion)
 Anibongan 
 Cam-boayon 
 Camam-onan 
 Ipil (Poblacion) 
 Lahi 
 Mahanub 
 Poniente 
 San Antonio (Bonot) 
 San Isidro (Parang)
 Sico-sico 
 Villaflor 
 Villafranca

Climate

Demographics

Economy

References

External links
Gigaquit Profile at PhilAtlas.com
Gigaquit Profile at the DTI Cities and Municipalities Competitive Index
[ Philippine Standard Geographic Code]
Philippine Census Information
Local Governance Performance Management System 

Municipalities of Surigao del Norte